Liu Congxiao (906-962), formally the Prince of Jinjiang, was a general of the Chinese Five Dynasties and Ten Kingdoms Period state Min.  After Min's fall, he initially submitted to Southern Tang (which had conquered Min), but eventually, taking advantage of Southern Tang's inability to fully control the region, took the southern part of the former Min realm under his own control, albeit in nominal submission to Southern Tang.  After Southern Tang's repeated defeats by Later Zhou, he also nominally submitted to Later Zhou's successor state Song.

Background 
Liu Congxiao was born in 906, at the very end of the Tang dynasty.  He was from Yongchn (永春, in modern Quanzhou, Fujian), which was known as Taolin early in his lifetime.  His father Liu Zhang died in his youth, and he became known for serving his mother and older brother piously.  He was said to be somewhat educated in literature, and was a particularly avid reader of military strategies.

Rebellion against Zhu Wenjin and subsequent service to Yin/Min 
As of 944, Liu Congxiao was serving as an army officer in the army of his home prefecture Quan Prefecture (泉州, in modern Quanzhou).  By that time, the state that Quan had been ruled by, Min, ruled by the imperial Wang family, had been broken apart by civil war and political strife—and now was under the reign of the usurper general Zhu Wenjin (who had assassinated the emperor Wang Xi (Emperor Jingzong), with Zhu's hold on the throne being Min contested by Wang Xi's brother Wang Yanzheng, who had earlier declared himself emperor of a breakaway state of Yin.

After seizing the Min throne, Zhu sent the general Huang Shaopo to Quan to serve as its prefect.  Liu, however, was discontented, and he stated to his colleagues Wang Zhongshun, Dong Si'an, and Zhang Hansi:

His colleagues agreed.  In winter 944, they held a feast at Liu's house, and they gathered the soldiers below them whom they deemed reliable and strong.  Liu spoke to them and stated (falsely, as it stood):

The soldiers became roused by his words and followed him in attacking Huang.  They climbed over the walls of the headquarters and killed Huang.  Liu then took the prefectural government seal and presented it to Wang Jixun, a nephew of Wang Yanzheng's who resided at Quan, asking Wang Jixun to serve as acting prefect.  Liu himself took the title of "Commander of the Army Against the Bandits".  He boxed Huang's head and had the officer Chen Hongjin deliver it to Wang Yanzheng's capital Jian Prefecture (建州, in modern Nanping, Fujian).  Wang Yanzheng commissioned Wang Jixun to be the prefect of Quan, and Liu, Wang Zhongshun, Dong, and Chen to be commanders of the army.

Hearing of Huang's death, Zhu sent the generals Lin Shouliang and Li Ting'e to attack Quan.  Wang Yanzheng, hearing the news, sent the general Du Jin to aid the Quan army.  However, even before Du arrived, Liu led the Quan army and engaged Zhu's army, killing Lin in battle and capturing Li.  Subsequently, Zhu was assassinated by his officer Li Renhan, who surrendered Fu to Wang Yanzheng, who then took the title of Emperor of Min.  However, a subsequent rebellion led by Li Renda at Fu wrested that region away from Wang Yanzheng, and Wang Yanzheng's capital Jian Prefecture then came under attack by the Southern Tang general Cha Wenhui.  During the Jian siege, Wang Yanzheng ordered Quan to send a 5,000-men detachment to Jian to help defend the city; that detachment was commanded by Dong and Wang Zhongshun.

As Southern Tang subject 
In fall 945, Jian fell to Southern Tang forces, and Wang Yanzheng surrendered.  (Wang Zhongshun died in the battle, and Dong Si'an took the remnants of his army and fled back to Quan.)  Initially, virtually the entire former Min domain submitted to Southern Tang's emperor Li Jing, including even Li Renda, who, however, continued to hold actual control of the Fu region.  In spring 946, Liu Congxiao, alleging that, given the threats posed by Li Renda's army and that Wang Jixun was alienating the Quan soldiers by improper rewards and punishments, forced him to yield the command to Liu himself.  Liu himself then attacked and defeated Li Renda in a battle, and then reported the news of the victory to Li Jing.  Li Jing summoned Wang Jixun to the Southern Tang capital Jinling and commissioned Liu as the prefect of Quan, but also sent a detachment to Quan, apparently to both help defend it and to watch over Liu.

In fall 946, the Zhang Prefecture (漳州, in modern Zhangzhou, Fujian) officer Lin Zanyao rebelled against Southern Tang and killed the general Chen Hui, whom Li Jing had sent to Zhang, and Chen's monitor of the army Zhou Chengyi.  Liu launched an army and expelled Lin from Zhang; he had Dong take over Zhang.  Li Jing then commissioned Dong as the prefect of Zhang.  (After Dong declined the position on grounds of naming taboo—because his father was named Dong Zhang—Li Jing renamed the prefecture Nan Prefecture, and so Dong accepted.)

Meanwhile, Li Renda had refused to yield actual control of Fu, leading to a Southern Tang expedition against him, commanded by the general Wang Chongwen.  Li Renda sought aid from Wuyue's king Qian Hongzuo.  Meanwhile, Li Jing ordered Dong and Liu to lead forces to reinforce Wang Chongwen.  It was said, though, that partly as a result of that, Wang's army was bogged down and unable to siege the city effectively—as both Liu and Wang Jianfeng were arrogant and not following Wang Chongwen's orders, while the civilian officials Chen Jue, Feng Yanlu, and Wei Cen were also disrupting Wang Chongwen's command structure.  In spring 947, the joint forces of Li Renda and Wuyue defeated the Southern Tang siege army, which then scattered—apparently, as a result of both Liu and Wang Jianfeng not wanting to see the army regroup and take Fu—ending Southern Tang's attempt to take actual control over Fu.

Liu returned to Quan, and then held a feast for the commanding general of the Southern Tang detachment, stating to him:

Seeing that Liu was effectively wanting to chase him out, the Southern Tang general found no choice but to take his army and leave Quan.  Li Jing could not think of a way to control Liu, and therefore had to be content with keeping him nominally as a subject, and granted him the honorary title of acting Taifu.

In 949, Liu's older brother Liu Congyuan, who was serving as Dong's deputy at Nan (Zhang), poisoned Dong to death and took over the control of the prefecture.  Li Jing, finding no good way to deal with the situation, established a Qingyuan Circuit with its headquarters at Quan, and made Liu its military governor (Jiedushi).  Not long after, he granted Liu honorary chancellor designations, and created him the Duke of E.  Later, that title was upgraded to Prince of Jinjiang.

Liu was said to be frugal and hardworking as the ruler of the region.  He usually wore civilian clothes, and placed his prefect uniform on at the door of his headquarters, putting it on only when he was to hear official matters and taking it off whenever unnecessary, to show humility and attentiveness to his civilian origin.  Wang Yanzheng had two daughters who lived at Quan because they had married men from there, and Liu honored and treated them well.  He also made sure that each year, knowledgeable individuals were selected for the imperial examinations.

In 958, during a campaign that Southern Tang's northern neighbor Later Zhou was waging against Southern Tang, Liu had his officer Cai Zhongyun, disguised as a merchant, travel to Later Zhou to submit a petition to be the subject of Later Zhou's emperor Guo Rong.  However, soon the war ended (with Li Jing ceding the territory north of the Yangtze River to Later Zhou and submitting to Guo as a subject), and when Liu submitted another petition, asking to establish a liaison office at Later Zhou's capital Kaifeng and directly submitting to Later Zhou.  Guo, citing the fact that Li Jing had already submitted and that Liu had been a long-time Southern Tang subject, refused, instead encouraging him to remain faithful to Li Jing.

As dual subject to Southern Tang and Song 
In 960, the Later Zhou general Zhao Kuangyin seized the throne from Guo Rong's son and successor Guo Zongxun, ending Later Zhou and starting a new Song dynasty as its Emperor Taizu.  Later in the year, Liu Congxiao submitted a petition to the new Song emperor, offering to be a subject, and thereafter offered tributes.  Around the same time, though, Li Jing, while also offering to be a Song vassal but fearing the possibility of Song military action against Southern Tang, decided to move his capital from Jinling to Nanchang, and did so in 961.  Liu, however, thought that movement of the capital was targeting him and feared a Southern Tang campaign against him, and therefore sent his nephew Liu Shaoji to offer tributes to Li, while at the same time continued to send tributes to the Song emperor through Wuyue.  The Song emperor sent an emissary, intending to comfort him, but before the emissary could arrive in Liu's territory, Liu had died from a tumor on his back, apparently in 962.  Li Jing's son and successor Li Yu bestowed posthumous honors on him.

As Liu Congxiao was sonless, he adopted both Liu Shaoji and another nephew, Liu Shaozi (both of them biological sons of Liu Congyuan) as his sons.  The Xu Zizhi Tongjian indicated that after his death, as Liu Shaoji was at the Southern Tang court, Liu Shaozi took over as acting military governor, but was soon seized by the officer Chen Hongjin, who falsely accused Liu Shaozi of wanting to submit to Wuyue and delivered Liu Shaozi to Southern Tang, while supporting Zhang Hansi as the new acting military governor.  Liu Congxiao's biography in the History of Song, however, gave a different account—that the coup took place while Liu Congxiao was ill but before his death—but its biography of Chen gave the same account as the Xu Zizhi Tongjian (i.e., the coup was during Liu Shaozi's rule).

Notes and references 

 History of Song, vol. 483.
 Spring and Autumn Annals of the Ten Kingdoms, vol. 93.
 Zizhi Tongjian, vols. 284, 285, 286, 288, 294.
 Xu Zizhi Tongjian, vols. 1, 2.

|- style="text-align: center;

906 births
962 deaths
Hokkien people
Politicians from Quanzhou
Generals from Fujian
Min Kingdom generals
Min Kingdom politicians
Southern Tang jiedushi of Qingyuan Circuit
Song dynasty jiedushi of Qingyuan Circuit
Later Liang (Five Dynasties) people born during Tang
Later Tang people
Later Jin (Five Dynasties) people